Marie de Courtenay (c. 1204 – September 1228) was an Empress of Nicaea. She was a daughter of Peter II of Courtenay and Yolanda of Flanders. She married Theodore I of Nicaea. Marie served as regent for her younger brother Baldwin II of Courtenay in 1228, and styled herself "Empress of Constantinople".

Family and background
Her parents were successive rulers of the Latin Empire of Constantinople. Her father Peter was chosen as emperor in 1216, but in 1217 while attempting to reach Constantinople by land was taken captive by Theodore Comnenus Ducas, the ruler of Epirus, and spent the rest of his life in captivity. Yolanda however reached Constantinople and took over the Empire. Marie's mother Yolanda was de jure regent for her husband, ruling alone from 1217 to 1219. She negotiated an alliance with Theodore I Lascaris of the Empire of Nicaea, which was sealed with the marriage of Theodore and Marie after Theodore repudiated his second wife Philippa of Armenia.

Empress of Nicaea
Marie was Empress of Nicaea from 1219 to November, 1221 when Theodore died. They had no known children. One of her stepdaughters, Maria Laskarina, became the wife of King Béla IV of Hungary, and the other, Irene Lascarina, was married to John III Doukas Vatatzes who took over the throne of the Nicaean Empire. Marie briefly served as regent of Nicaea in 1222.

Regent and Empress of Constantinople
Her brother Robert of Courtenay succeeded their mother in 1219. In late January 1228 Robert himself died. Their younger brother Baldwin II of Courtenay succeeded to the throne. He was only eleven years old, and thus underage. The barons of Constantinople elected Marie regent, and she styled herself "Empress", but her regency lasted only until her own death eight months later.

References

Sources

External links
Her listing along with her siblings in "Medieval lands" by Charles Cawley.

1204 births
1228 deaths
Capetian House of Courtenay
Laskarid dynasty
13th-century Byzantine people
13th-century women rulers
Empresses of Nicaea
Regents of the Latin Empire